Giulio I Cybo-Malaspina (1525 – 18 May 1548) (or Cibo) was an Italian noble from Genoa who was marquis of Massa and lord of Carrara from 1546 until 1548.

Born in Rome, he was the son of Ricciarda Malaspina, duchess of Massa and Carrara and Lorenzo Cybo, duke of Ferentillo who changed his name to Cybo-Malaspina, and a great-grandson of Pope Innocent VIII. His mother was the heir of the state of Massa and Carrara, which she had inherited from her father.

In 1546, he challenged his mother for control of the duchy of Massa and Carrara. With the backing of Cosimo I de' Medici and Andrea Doria, he seized control by force in 1546. Soon after, his mother appealed to Charles V, Holy Roman Emperor, and Charles sent his forces to seize Massa while Giulio was away.

In March 1546, Giulio married Peretta Doria (1526–1591), daughter of Tommaso and sister of Giannettino Doria. Giulio had been promised a large dowry, which he wanted to fund a return to power, but Andrea Doria refused, arguing that he'd already spent more than the dowry on Giulio's first attempt to seize the Duchy. At that time Andrea Doria was a Genoese admiral in the service of Emperor and King of Spain Charles V (with whom the petty Massese state had allied so far). After Doria refused to fund him, Giulio set a plot against him together with Ottobuono Fieschi, Ottobuono Fieschi and other Genoese refugees, also backed by the Strozzi family of Florence and Pope Paul III. The aim was to enter the city and kill Doria, the Spanish ambassador and other members of the Doria party. With the help of the pope and Piero Strozzi, the revolt should spread to the whole Italy, with the objective to expel the Spaniards from the country.

The plot was discovered before its beginning and Cybo was arrested in Pontremoli. Despite an attempt to save him from his cousin Cosimo I of Tuscany, he was beheaded in Milan in May 1548. His body was buried in the Cathedral of Massa. At his mother's death in 1553, the states of Massa and Carrara were ultimately inherited by his brother Alberico I Cybo-Malaspina, Prince of Massa.

See also
History of Genoa
Italian Wars

References

1525 births
1548 deaths
16th-century executions by Spain
16th-century Italian nobility
Executed Italian people
Nobility from Genoa
Lords of Carrara
Marquisses of Massa
People from the Province of Massa-Carrara
Giulio
People executed by the Duchy of Milan
People executed in the Holy Roman Empire by decapitation